Friederike Charlotte of Stolberg-Gedern (3 April 1686 - 10 January 1739), was a German noblewoman of The House of Stolberg and by marriage Countess of Solms-Laubach.

Early life & marriage 
Born Friedrike Charlotte on April 3, 1686, in Gedern, she was the third of twenty-three children to Count Louis Christian of Stolberg-Gedern (1652 -1710) and Christine of Mecklenburg-Güstrow (1663-1749). Her elder siblings twins Gustav Adolph and an unnamed sister had died previously on January 17, 1684.

When Friedrike was twenty-three years old when she married Friedrich Ernst, Count of Solms-Laubach on December 8, 1709, in Gedern. Friedrich was president of the Reichskammergerichts and was succeeded by his surviving sons, Friedrich Magnus II and Christian August. Together they had thirteen children together, and only three would survive into adulthood.

Death 
Friedrike was 53 years old when she died on January 10, 1739, in Laubach. She was buried in the local Evangelical church.

References 

1686 births
1739 deaths
German nobility
House of Stolberg